Reyhanabad may refer to:
 Reyhanabad, Kerman
 Reyhanabad, Mazandaran
 Reyhanabad, Tehran
 Reyhanabad, West Azerbaijan